The women's javelin throw throwing event at the 1960 Olympic Games took place on September 1.

Results
Top 12 throwers and ties plus all throwers reaching 48.00 metres advanced to the finals. All distances are listed in metres.

Qualifying

Final

Key: OR = Olympic record

References

M
Javelin throw at the Olympics
1960 in women's athletics
Women's events at the 1960 Summer Olympics